Tinotenda Chibharo (born 11 November 1992) is a Zimbabwean professional footballer who plays as an attacking midfielder or striker.

Career
Born in Zimbabwean capital Harare he was the youngest in a family of 11 which, he started playing soccer at the age of 7. He was studying at Prince Edward School where he was scouted from Winthrop University in United States where he continued his studies. Chibharo then went on to play with English side Liversedge of Cleckheaton.

In summer 2017, Chibharo, moved to Serbian football together with Tendai Chitiza in a move facilitated by former Zimbabwe and Chapungu midfielder Kennedy Chihuri and his partner Trevor Mazhande. He made 7 appearances for FK Sloboda Užice in the 2017–18 Serbian First League this way further widening the selection base for the Warriors. Sloboda spotted him at the 2017 edition of the African Nations Cup UK which Chibharo was star at.

References

1992 births
Living people
Sportspeople from Harare
Zimbabwean footballers
Zimbabwean expatriate footballers
Association football forwards
Winthrop University alumni
Expatriate soccer players in the United States
Expatriate footballers in England
FK Sloboda Užice players
Serbian First League players
Expatriate footballers in Serbia